Clinical Proteomics is a peer-reviewed open access medical journal published  by BioMed Central. Covers scientific research in the field of translational proteomics with an emphasis on the application of proteomic technology to all aspects of clinical research. It was established in March 2004 and the editor in chief is Daniel W. Chan (Johns Hopkins School of Medicine).

Scope 
The journal publishes articles on a variety of subjects including: Clinical sample collection and handling to preserve proteins, new technology, including protein arrays, mass spectrometry, microanalytic devices, nanotechnology, and biosensors for protein-based clinical bioassays and clinical chemistry assays, bioinformatics tools including pattern recognition, artificial intelligence, and computer learning algorithms.

Abstracting and indexing 
The journal is abstracted and indexed in EBSCO databases, AGRICOLA, Chemical Abstracts Service, and EMBASE.

References

External links 
 

English-language journals
Publications established in 2004
Creative Commons Attribution-licensed journals
Proteomics journals